The Get Sleazy Tour (stylized as Get $leazy Tour) was the first concert tour by American recording artist Kesha in support of both her first album, Animal, and first extended play, Cannibal. Officially announced on November 8, 2010, the tour visited the Americas, Australia and Europe. It was scheduled to visit Asia but due to the 2011 Tōhoku earthquake and tsunami, the tour was postponed indefinitely. Described by Kesha as "a ridiculously fun dance party", the concerts were presented as underground rave ups drawing inspiration from parties she would attend while growing up in Tennessee. The tour kicked off on February 15, 2011, in Portland, Oregon, and ended September 29, 2011, in Rio de Janeiro.

Critical reception to the tour has been generally mixed to positive. Kesha's vocals on the tour were generally praised although some critics noted the overuse of backtrack on some songs. Her charisma and stage presence was also generally met with positive reception. Despite Kesha receiving positive reviews her original opener, Beardo, was met with extremely negative reception with multiple critics calling him unfunny. After a successful sold out first run in North America, she extended her tour into the summer including dates in the United Kingdom and additional dates in the United States.

Background and development

The tour was officially announced on November 8, 2010, via the artist's official website. The tour comes months after Kesha toured the United States with Rihanna as the opening act on her Last Girl on Earth and her own promotional tour in the United Kingdom during the Fall of 2010 to support her first studio album, Animal. During an interview with Gary Graff (from Billboard) Kesha explained her inspiration for the tour, describing it as "a ridiculously fun dance party that will build on the energetic sets she played while opening for Rihanna last summer." She elaborated, 

Five concerts in Asia were originally planned for March 2011. Due to the 2011 Tōhoku earthquake and tsunami, the shows were postponed on March 15, 2011. The singer responded, "My heart is with Japan right now through this disaster and these hardships. I genuinely don't think right now would be appropriate timing for me to perform in Japan given the content and the spirit of my show, which is all about feeling exuberant, rowdy, and wild. I plan to bring my party there and to that part of the world when we are all ready to dance and Get $leazy together again. In the meantime I am going to do everything I can to help relief efforts and I encourage everyone in the world to do the same." After a successful run in North America, the singer extended her tour into the summer including dates in the United Kingdom and additional dates in the United States. Kesha described the extension saying, "My spring tour sold out so fast, which is amazing, but I want to get to party with errryone. If you are part of my family, my cult of rowdy misfits, come join us! I’m pulling out an ass-ton more glitter with blue lipstick to spare and I’m ready to party with all y’all all summer long. Sh–'s gonna be hot as a mofo [...] Miss this and you be missing the biggest dance party of the year!"

The set list is mainly derived from Kesha's first album Animal, and follow-up extended play (EP) Cannibal. Besides tracks from those albums, Kesha incorporated covers of the Beastie Boys song, "(You Gotta) Fight for Your Right (To Party!)" to "give the show a more rock'n'roll edge." She told Kevin O'Donnell of Spin, "I've been on this Iggy Pop kick — he's just so inspiring to watch as a performer, [...] I'm trying to do something like that, minus the heroin and the stabbing myself part." The theme of the tour is "to bring the planet an epic dance party [...] That's my mentality with this tour — party as hard as we can and make it as infectious as possible. It's unlike anything anyone else in pop music is doing." Visually, the theaters and auditoriums hosting the show will be transformed and presented as "basement rave-ups". The inspiration came from her earlier life when she was growing up in Tennessee where she would attend parties. To achieve this look, the singer worked with the creative team responsible for Daft Punk's concerts. The look is described as Mad Max and "intergalactic spaceship" combination.

Concert synopsis

Opening with the concert's title track "Sleazy", Kesha, wearing glasses outlined by an arrangement of lights, a black leotard encrusted with rhinestones and diamonds, appears in the middle of a large structure in the shape of a diamond where she acts as the night's DJ. Surrounded by her band and background dancers, seen wearing clothing described as a blend between "Mad Max and [...] prehistoric birds", she remains in the structure while transitioning into the following song, "Take It Off". She performs the next two songs, "Fuck Him He's a DJ" and "Dirty Picture", in the structure as she presses buttons that set different synths into motion and plays on percussion boards. By the concert's fifth song, "Blow", she emerges from the structure and takes center stage, shooting glitter cannons at the audience.

During "Cannibal", Kesha, now wearing an American flag ensemble with black ripped fishnets, proceeds to tie up one of her male dancers to an X-shaped post. She then proceeds to pull a glowing red heart from the dancer's chest as fake blood covers herself and the man. For the final part of the evening, Kesha changes into a rhinestone infused skeleton bodysuit. The suit was also worn by Kesha when she kickstarted on the inaugural Conan Summer Concert Series. She later asks for a "man who enjoys being abused" from the audience; she brings him onto the stage, then duct tapes him to a chair, giving him a lap dance as she sings her song "Grow a Pear". As she sings, a background dancer dressed as a penis joins Kesha and the man on stage, dancing and jumping around. The concert is ended with "Tik Tok" and an encore consisting of "We R Who We R" and the Beastie Boys track "(You Gotta) Fight for Your Right (To Party!)".

Critical reception

Stephan Lee from Entertainment Weekly was positive in the review of the concert. Lee was skeptical of the concert initially, citing her "less-than-stellar TV performances" as the reason for the apprehension but wrote that he was surprised at "how unexpectedly awesome the show was". Kesha's vocal performance was praised with Lee noting that her vocals sounded nearly identical to how her records sounded. The shows atmosphere was praised with Lee noting that "she packed infinitely more entertainment value and energy into the show by way of pure, unabashed silliness than Britney Spears did in her much more expensive and lavish Circus tour." Lee ended his review of the concert comparing Kesha to Lady Gaga, Katy Perry and Britney Spears stating that "I think Kesha doesn't get much respect because people have a hard time seeing what she brings to the table that other pop solo artists like Britney, Gaga, and Katy Perry don’t already, but her persona was fully on display last night, and it was all her own." Mark Lore from Spin, referring to an earlier quote by Kesha, "I'm going to bring the planet an epic dance party", wrote that she lived up to her word calling the night "such good, sleazy fun". "Cannibal" and "Grow a Pear" were two highlights from the review, being called "well-executed" and for not taking herself too seriously. Lore complimented the choice of set-list and the nights overall atmosphere praising the humor present throughout the show.

Jason MacNeil from the Toronto Sun wrote that the show's opening seemed a bit tame for someone like Kesha, writing that it was not until "Take It Off" "that stiffness slowly melted away." MacNeil's consensus for the show was, "It took her a little while to find that seedy, trashy animal magnetism she exudes so well, but when she did, pop singer Kesha was money in the bank." The review highlighted the show's theatrics, citing "Grow A Pear" as the strongest part of the show. MacNeil went on to give the concert three and a half stars out of five. Megan Buerger of the Washington Post called the concert "an assaulting tribute to partying and debauchery." Buerger praised her charisma on her singles writing that she had consistent "unfaltering energy" on them. Her vocals on "Animal" and "The Harold Song" were called "startling" with Buerger writing that "despite her efforts to hide it, there seems to be a singer behind all that sleaze. Perhaps the most startling moment of the evening featured the lone Kesha on stage [...] she offered a fleeting glimpse at her under-utilized vocal talent." The review of the concert was ended with the consensus that "her refusal to take herself seriously is refreshing and even a little endearing. She may be rough around the edges, but boring, she's not."

Bree Davies from Westword criticized the opening act, Beardo, calling him an unfunny and unbelievable version of "Weird-Al-meets-License-to-Ill-era-Beastie-Boys". Davies had a positive impression of the concert overall, praising her stage presence for "her ability to keep every pair of mostly-female eyes on her at all times" and for presenting an "expensive-looking big bang-up stage show combined with lowest common denominator pop". David Burger from The Salt Lake Tribune criticized Kesha's stage presence and charisma blaming it on the venue. The review highlighted songs such as "Tik Tok" and "Your Love Is My Drug" but criticized the middle third of the show which featured ballads. Matt Farley and Erica Boniface from KUSA gave credit to Kesha's performance and live band for "sticking to her R-rated guns". Her opener Beardo however, was deemed "possibly the worst act ever to perform at the Fillmore". Lauren Carter from Boston Herald wrote that the show was "technically a success" praising her vocals on her songs that "all knocked appropriately." Carter was also negative in the review however, criticizing her on her insistence "on seeming wild, crazy and amoral, which for anyone not drunk or ensnared in the Ke$ha web, was simply draining."

Opening acts
Beardo (North America—Leg 1,3)
3OH!3 (Geneseo)
Natalia Kills (United Kingdom)
LMFAO (United Kingdom, North America—Leg 3)
Spank Rock (North America—Leg 3)

Setlist
"Sleazy"
"Take It Off"
"Fuck Him He's a DJ"
"Dirty Picture"
"Blow"
"Blah Blah Blah"
"Party at a Rich Dude's House"
"Backstabber"
"Cannibal"
"The Harold Song"
"C U Next Tuesday"
"Animal"
"Dinosaur"
"Grow a Pear"
"Your Love Is My Drug"
"Tik Tok"
Encore
"We R Who We R"
"(You Gotta) Fight for Your Right (To Party!)"

Source:

Tour dates

Cancellations and rescheduled shows

Box office score data

References

External links

2011 concert tours
Kesha concert tours